Nicola Chetta, (Arbërisht: Nikollë Keta; 12 July 1741 – 15 December 1803) was an Arbëresh writer and priest. He was born in Contessa Entellina, Sicily. He was educated at the Greek Orthodox seminary in Palermo. In 1777, Keta himself became rector of the seminary. As a poet, he wrote both religious and secular verse in Albanian and Greek, and has the honour of having composed the first Albanian sonnet (1777).

References

1740 births
1803 deaths
People from Contessa Entellina
Italian poets
Italian male poets
18th-century Albanian people
Albanian-language poets
Greek-language poets
Poets from Sicily
Writers from the Province of Palermo